Circus Remedy is a circus outreach non-profit organization. It was founded in 2006 by friends Anthony Lucero, Terry Notary, and Christine Harnos.

Circus Remedy produced two short films, Bipsy Twirlarina and the Make Believe Kid, and The Fable of Profitt the Fox, both for children's hospitals. In 2009, Circus Remedy introduced The Little Hands Project to California schools, connecting healthy children to children with illness.

The organization has not filed tax returns with the IRS since 2016. In 2016, the organization disclosed that it had made a loan to a member of its board of directors. In 2016 the organization spent in excess of $20,000 on office furniture; $15,000 on travel; $2,400 on auto expenses; and $2,000 on office expenses. The 2016 disclosure did not indicate a single visit to a children's hospital.

Income
According to its publicly available financial disclosures, Circus Remedy had gross income as follows since its founding:

 2005: $5,200
 2006: $31,078
 2007: $122,352
 2008: $14,564
 2009: $7,167
 2010: $0
 2011: $0
 2012: $0
 2013: $0
 2014: $0
 2015: $10,000
 2016: $110,000

No public disclosures were filed after 2016.

References

Child-related organizations in the United States
Circus-related organizations
Children's health